Christofi is a Greek surname, commonly found in Cyprus. Notable people with the surname include:

 Alex Christofi, British Cypriot novelist
 Alkiviadis Christofi (born 1992), Cypriot footballer
 Demetris Christofi (born 1988), Cypriot footballer
 Demetris Christofi (born 1994), Cypriot footballer
 Eleni Christofi (born 1998), Greek tennis player
 Styllou Christofi (1900–1954), Greek Cypriot convicted of murder